Moral Fibre is a 1921 American silent drama film directed by Webster Campbell and starring Corinne Griffith, Catherine Calvert and Harry C. Browne.

Cast 
 Corinne Griffith as Marion Wolcott
 Catherine Calvert as Grace Elmore
 William Parke Jr. as Jared Wolcott
 Harry C. Browne as George Elmore
 Joe King as John Corliss
 Alice Concord as Nancy Bartley

References

Bibliography 
 Connelly, Robert B. The Silents: Silent Feature Films, 1910–36, Volume 40, Issue 2. December Press, 1998.
 Munden, Kenneth White. The American Film Institute Catalog of Motion Pictures Produced in the United States, Part 1. University of California Press, 1997.

External links 
 

1921 films
1921 drama films
1920s English-language films
American silent feature films
Silent American drama films
American black-and-white films
Films directed by Webster Campbell
Vitagraph Studios films
1920s American films